Machine Gun Mama is a 1944 American musical comedy film directed by Harold Young.  It was PRC's attempt to feature a comedy team to compete with Universal's Abbott and Costello and Paramount's Road to ... movies, as well as their entry in the Good Neighbor Policy film genre of the time where the United States presented both a positive image to Latin and South America as well as stimulating American tourism to the region.  Harold Young had also directed the live action portions of Walt Disney's The Three Caballeros.

The film had the working titles Mexican Fiesta and Moonlight Fiesta but is also known as Tropical Fury as an American TV title of the film.

Plot summary 
Two truck drivers from Brooklyn travel to Mexico to deliver an elephant named "Bunny", but they have lost the address where Bunny is to be delivered. Adopting the elephant as their own, the two stumble into a traveling carnival headed by Alberto Cordoba and his daughter Nita. The carnival is destitute and menaced by loan sharks.  The two Americans sell Bunny to the carnival to replace their recently departed flea circus but agree not to accept their payment until the carnival regains its fortune thanks to Bunny and Brooklyn "ballyhoo". The loan sharks attempt a variety of dirty tricks against the gringos.

The title comes from a furious Nita turning a compressed air pellet firing machine gun carnival attraction on the Americans.

Cast 
Armida as Nita Cordoba
El Brendel as Ollie Swenson
Wallace Ford as John O'Reilly
Jack La Rue as Jose
Luis Alberni as Ignacio
Ariel Heath as The Blonde
Julian Rivero as Alberto Cordoba
Eumenio Blanco as First Detective
Anthony Warde as Carlos

Soundtrack 
 "Mi Amor" (written by Sam Neuman and Michael Breen)
 "Moonlight Fiesta" (written by Sam Neuman and Michael Breen)

Notes

External links 

1944 films
1940s Spanish-language films
American black-and-white films
1944 musical comedy films
1944 romantic comedy films
Films set in Mexico
American adventure comedy films
Producers Releasing Corporation films
Films directed by Harold Young (director)
1940s romantic musical films
American romantic musical films
American musical comedy films
1940s English-language films
1940s American films